Stefan Pankovych (29 October 1820 – 29 August 1874) was a Ruthenian Greek Catholic hierarch. He was bishop of the Ruthenian Catholic Eparchy of Mukacheve from 1867 to 1874.

Born in Veľaty, Austrian Empire (present day – Slovakia) in 1820, he was ordained a priest on 27 August 1851. He was confirmed as the Bishop by the Holy See on 22 February 1867. He was consecrated to the Episcopate on 5 May 1867. The principal consecrator was Bishop Jozef Gaganec.

He died in Uzhhorod on 29 August 1874.

References 

1820 births
1874 deaths
People from Trebišov District
19th-century Eastern Catholic bishops
Ruthenian Catholic bishops